Torn Apart can refer to:

"Torn Apart" (Enter Shikari song), a 2015 single by British band Enter Shikari
"Torn Apart" (Bastille song), a 2014 single by British band Bastille featuring GRADES
"Torn Apart" (Snoop Lion song), a 2013 promotional single by American singer Snoop Lion featuring Rita Ora
"Torn Apart", a 1998 song by Stabbing Westward from Darkest Days
Torn Apart (album), a 2005 album by Australian band Area-7
Torn Apart (film), a 1996 machinima film
Torn Apart: The Life of Ian Curtis, a 2006 biography of Ian Curtis of Joy Division by Mick Middles and Lindsay Reade
The Walking Dead: Torn Apart, a 2011 web series based on the TV series The Walking Dead